Ralph Robert "Curley" Jones (September 22, 1880 – July 26, 1951) was an American high school and college football and basketball coach. He also served as the head coach for the Chicago Bears of the National Football League (NFL) from 1930 to 1932, leading them to the 1932 NFL championship.

Early years

State of Indiana
Jones was an integral part of the development of high school basketball in Indiana and a successful college coach at Purdue and Illinois.  He was the recipient of the Indiana Basketball Hall of Fame's inaugural Centennial Award on November 27, 2010. It is believed that Jones was the first high school basketball coach in the state of Indiana. While still a high school student, he organized the team at Indianapolis Shortridge High School in 1899—the first high school team in Indiana. Jones led the Indianapolis YMCA to statewide prominence, and then led the Crawfordsville YMCA, both of which claimed state YMCA championships under his guidance. Due to his success with YMCA-based leagues, Butler University contracted Jones to coach basketball for the 1903–04 season.  This was the first "official" head coaching job in the long and successful career Jones would continue for the next 30 years.

Jones continued his coaching at Crawfordsville, this time at the local high school and additionally took on the head coaching duties of Wabash College. His teams at both institutions featured hall of fame inductees Ward "Piggy" Lambert, Pete Vaughn and David Glascock, with the 1906–07 Crawfordsville squad finishing 12–0 (prior to the first high school state tournament) and his 1907–08 Wabash team going 24–0.  While at Wabash, his team was selected from only 300 students, yet in five years lost only four games, twice to Notre Dame and once to Purdue.  Known as the "Little Giants", Jones's Wabash teams compiled a record of 75–6 and defeated teams from much larger institutions, including Illinois, Purdue, Indiana, Minnesota and Notre Dame.  During this same time period, Jones's Crawfordsville High School teams lost only one game.

Purdue University
Jones moved on to Purdue in 1910, beginning a three-year tenure that resulted in a 32–9 record and the first two Big Nine championships in program history (1911 and 1912). He also mentored the first All-American in Purdue basketball history, as Dave Charters garnered consensus honors in both 1910 and 1911.

University of Illinois
After his three seasons at Purdue, Jones headed to the University of Illinois. During his tenure at Illinois, Jones took a mediocre team and within two years established a dominant system that led to a 16–0 record in 1914–15. His 1914–15 team was retroactively named the national champion by the Helms Athletic Foundation and the Premo-Porretta Power Poll. Jones's basketball teams at Illinois won 85 games and lost 34. He also won two Big Ten or "Big Nine" titles. Jones also was the athletic director for two years as well as being the assistant football coach to Bob Zuppke from 1913 through 1919.

After Jones left Illinois, he went to Lake Forest Academy in Lake Forest, Illinois. He was there for 10 years coaching both basketball and football. His football teams won 76 games and lost only six games in his 10 years. During this tenure, his basketball teams had a record of 94–9.

Chicago Bears
After George Halas retired as a player-coach in 1930, he hired Jones to take over his team as head coach. Even though Jones led the team to a 24–10–7 record, due to the economic depression which was affecting every business across the United States, the financial health of the franchise began to suffer. With many people out of work, fewer and fewer individuals could pay for the cost of a ticket to attend a Bears game. Consequently, even though the team won the NFL championship in 1932, by the end of the season the franchise had lost approximately $18,000. Dutch Sternaman sold his half of the team to Halas, and Halas resumed coaching the team in order to save the cost of a head coach's salary. During his tenure with the Bears, Jones lined the quarterback directly under center, the first time this had been done. Next, he spaced out the offensive line and devised blocking schemes that would open holes in the defense. He refined the T formation by introducing wide ends and a halfback in motion. While Jones was head coach, Bronko Nagurski made his NFL debut as a member of the Chicago Bears. His .706 winning percentage is the best in Bears history.

During his time at Lake Forest College Jones tinkered with simple options on the basic T formation. Many coaches were searching for answers to an easy-to-teach formation that was also not easy to defend. Jones approached Halas with various diagrammed options. Not until Clark Shaughnessy, head coach at the University of Chicago, approached Halas with very complex formations in 1935 did the T become effective. Many coaches contributed to the success of the T-formation that swept college and pro football in 1940. Shaughnessy's Stanford University team went 10–0 and defeated the University of Nebraska in the Rose Bowl with his elaborate T-formation. Weeks later, Halas's Bears defeated the Washington Redskins 73–0 with the same system. Jones left the Bears to become athletic director at Lake Forest College.

All told, Jones tallied 404 wins in his coaching career for a winning record of better than 83 percent. He also mentored nine college All-Americans.

Basketball Hall of Fame inductee Ward Lambert dedicated his 1932 book, Practical Basketball, to "Ralph Jones, my coach."

Personal life
Jones married Florence C. Pyle in 1903 and remained with her until his death, a 48 year marriage. Jones wrote his first published book entitled, "Basketball from a Coaching Standpoint", published by Flanigan-Pearson Company, Printers and released in 1916. He also co-wrote, "The Modern "T" Formation with Man-in-motion" with Clark Daniel Shaughnessy and George Halas. This book was related to football and released in 1946.

Head coaching record

High school basketball

College basketball

College football

NFL

1 The result of the 1932 NFL Playoff Game to determine the NFL champion between the Chicago Bears and the Portsmouth Spartans counted in the regular season standings.
2 Prior to the 1972 season ties did not count in the NFL Standings therefore the Bears (6-1-6) and the Spartans (6-1-4) were considered tied atop the standings ahead of the Packers (10-3-1)

References

External links

1880 births
1951 deaths
American men's basketball coaches
Basketball coaches from Indiana
Butler Bulldogs men's basketball coaches
Chicago Bears coaches
College men's basketball head coaches in the United States
High school basketball coaches in Illinois
High school basketball coaches in Indiana
High school football coaches in Illinois
Illinois Fighting Illini men's basketball coaches
Lake Forest Foresters athletic directors
Lake Forest Foresters football coaches
Lake Forest Foresters men's basketball coaches
People from Marion County, Indiana
Purdue Boilermakers men's basketball coaches
Wabash Little Giants baseball coaches
Wabash Little Giants basketball coaches
Wabash Little Giants football coaches
Chicago Bears head coaches